Simone Fontecchio (born 9 December 1995) is an Italian professional basketball player for the Utah Jazz of the National Basketball Association (NBA). He plays at the small forward position.

Youth career
Fontecchio participated in an array of youth tournaments:
2011 Jordan Brand Classic International Tour game in London (not to be confused with the International Game of the same tournament)
2012 Albert Schweitzer Tournament
2012 Basketball Without Borders Europe
2012-13 Euroleague Basketball Next Generation Tournament Rome tournament.

Besides playing for Italy (see International career), he notably won the Italian Under 17 championship in 2011–12 and the Under 19 championship the same season and in 2012-13, all for Virtus Bologna.

Professional career

Virtus Bologna (2012–2016) 
Fontecchio was promoted from the Virtus U19 to the senior side in 2012-13, alternating between the two during the season. He played a symbolic minute in LBA on 4 November 2011 before posting his first genuine first division stat sheet, missing his five shots for three rebounds and a steal, on 30 December.

After an active youth career (see Youth career) and a professional debut at only 17, there was talk of him going to the United States to play high school and later on College basketball, however he stayed loyal to Virtus and signed a 5-year professional contract with the team in June 2013, his parents had to be present as he was still a minor at the time.

After twice being selected to take part in the league All Star Game (2014 and 2015), he was voted Best Player Under 22 in May 2015.
That season would also see his first participation in the playoffs, scoring 10.3 points and grabbing 3.3 rebounds per game as Virtus were swept by title holders Olimpia Milano.

Fontecchio declared for the 2015 NBA draft on 25 April as an early entrant, two years before being automatically eligible in 2017.
He attended a draft workout with the Boston Celtics in June 2015, whilst they declaredly considered picking in the second round, he withdrew his candidacy on 16 June 2015.

Olimpia Milano (2016–2019) 
After an unsatisfying 2018-19 season with Olimpia Milano, where Fontecchio played an average of less than a minute Euroleague and 2.8 minutes in Serie A, Fontecchio was set to join his former team Virtus Bologna, coached by Aleksandar Đorđević, but the agreement was not finalized.

Reggio Emilia (2019–2020) 
On 18 July 2019, Fontecchio signed with Reggio Emilia in the Italian Lega Basket Serie A (LBA).

Alba Berlin (2020–2021) 
On 7 July 2020, Fontecchio signed with Alba Berlin of the Basketball Bundesliga (BBL). It was here where Fontecchio broke out, averaging 10.6 points in over 23 minutes per game.

Baskonia (2021–2022) 
On 9 July 2021, Fontecchio signed a three-year deal with Baskonia of the Liga ACB.

Utah Jazz (2022–present) 
On 17 July 2022, Fontecchio signed a two-year contract with the National Basketball Association's (NBA) Utah Jazz. Fontecchio made his NBA debut on 19 October. On 7 December, Fontecchio made a game-winning dunk in a 124–123 win over the Golden State Warriors.

National team career
Fontecchio has played for the under age teams of Italy since turning up for the U16's in the 2011 European Championship (10th place).
Since then, he was involved with the U18's in the 2012 European Championship (7th place) and 2013 European Championship (10th place, best scorer for Italy) and the U20's in the 2014 European Championship (10th place).

Fontecchio participated to the 2020 Summer Olympics basketball tournament with Italy, reaching the quarterfinals. He was the leading scorer in Italy's 92–82 win over Germany, scoring 20 points, grabbing 4 rebounds, dishing out 2 assists and stealing 3 balls. He was also Italy's top performer in this game, with a 21 efficiency rate. He was again the leading scorer in Italy's 83–86 loss to eventual bronze medalist Australia, with 22 points. In the third and last game of their group stage, Italy defeated Nigeria 80–71, and Fontecchio tied with Pajola for assists leader. Italy lost 75–84 to eventual silver medalist France in quarterfinals. In this game, Fontecchio was the leading scorer with 23 points. By the end of the tournament he was ranked among the players who "should be on NBA radars".

Personal life
Fontecchio's mother Malì Pomilio played for Italy and won two European titles for AS Vicenza in basketball, and Fontecchio considers her as an influence in his career choice. His father Daniele  was a professional hurdler whilst his grandfather was also a basketball player, as is his older brother Luca who has played in the lower divisions after also coming through the youth ranks of Virtus.

Fontecchio moved to Bologna from his native Pescara at the age of 14, living in shared accommodation with other Virtus youth players.

Career statistics

Euroleague

|-
| style="text-align:left;"|2016–17
| style="text-align:left;" rowspan="3"|Olimpia
| 10 || 2 || 11.7 || .433 || .412 || .000 || 1.5 || .8 || .5 || .1 || 3.3 || 1.9
|-
| style="text-align:left;"|2017–18
| 2 || 0 || 2.0 || .000 || .000 || .000 || .0 || .0 || .0 || .0 || .0 || .0
|-
| style="text-align:left;"|2018–19
| 5 || 0 || .8 || .000 || .000 || .000 || .0 || .0 || .0 || .0 || .0 || 
|-
| style="text-align:left;"|2020–21
| style="text-align:left;"|Alba
| 29 || 24 || 23.4 || .476 || .388 || .886 || 3.4 || 1.6 || .9 || .2 || 10.6 || 10.1
|-
| style="text-align:left;"|2021–22
| style="text-align:left;"|Baskonia
| 17 || 11 || 26.4 || .475 || .426 || .793 || 4.4 ||2.2 || 1.2 || .1 || 11.9 || 13.2
|- class="sortbottom"
| style="text-align:center;" colspan="2"|Career
| 63 || 37 || 19.8 || .470 || .400 || .844 || 3.0 || 1.4 || .8 || .2 || 8.6 || 8.4

Lega Basket Serie A

|-
| style="text-align:left;"|2012–13
| style="text-align:left" rowspan="4"|Virtus Bologna
| style="text-align:left;"|Serie A
| 12 || 12.8 || .324 || .222 || .800 || 1.4 || .2 || .4 || .2 || 2.7
|-
| style="text-align:left;"|2013–14
| style="text-align:left;"|Serie A
| 25 || 15.4 || .426 || .345 || .750 || 1.1 || .2 || .4 || .2 || 2.7
|-
| style="text-align:left;"|2014–15
| style="text-align:left;"|Serie A
| 30 || 24.5 || .384 || .292 || .659 || 2.3 || 1.5 || .9 || .2 || 7.4
|-
| style="text-align:left;"|2015–16
| style="text-align:left;"|Serie A
| 30 || 27.5 || .397 || .328 || .838 || 3.5 || 1.9 || 1.0 || .1 || 9.2
|-
| style="text-align:left;"|2016–17
| style="text-align:left" rowspan="2"|Olimpia Milano
| style="text-align:left;"|Serie A
| 28 || 12.1 || .495 || .422 || .714 || 1.6 || .8 || .4 || .1 || 4.6
|-
| style="text-align:left;" rowspan="2"|2017–18
| style="text-align:left;"|Serie A
| 4 || 7.5 || .286 || .200 ||  || .3 || .0 || .3 || .1 || 1.3
|-
| style="text-align:left;"|Vanoli Cremona
| style="text-align:left;"|Serie A
| 23 || 23.6 || .422 || .385 || .806 || 3.1 || .8 || .9 || .4 || 10.1
|-
| style="text-align:left;"| 2018–19
| style="text-align:left;"|Olimpia Milano
| style="text-align:left;"|Serie A
| 34 || 12 || .443 || .375 || .857 || 1.1 || .3 || .3 || .2 || 4.0

Sources: Serie A

References

External links

 EuroLeague.net profile
 Virtus Bologna profile 
 Eurobasket profile
 DraftExpress profile
 Players Group agency profile

1995 births
Living people
Alba Berlin players
Basketball players at the 2020 Summer Olympics
Italian expatriate basketball people in Germany
Italian expatriate basketball people in Spain
Italian men's basketball players
Lega Basket Serie A players
National Basketball Association players from Italy
Olimpia Milano players
Olympic basketball players of Italy
Pallacanestro Reggiana players
Saski Baskonia players
Shooting guards
Small forwards
Sportspeople from Pescara
Undrafted National Basketball Association players
Utah Jazz players
Vanoli Cremona players
Virtus Bologna players